Charaxes matakall is a butterfly in the family Nymphalidae. It is found in the Republic of the Congo and the Democratic Republic of the Congo.

References

External links
Charaxes matakal images at Consortium for the Barcode of Life

Butterflies described in 1985
matakall